Lindiwe Thembekani "Thembeka" Ndlovu (8 January 1977 – 11 January 2021) was a South African actress. She is best known for the roles in the films Little One (2013), Safari (2013) and Winnie Mandela (2011).

Personal life
Ndlovu was born on 8 January 1977, in Dube, Soweto, South Africa, as the elder daughter of the family. She was raised in the eThekwini town of Hammarsdale. Her father Stanford Ngidi was a popular community playwright, who died in 2015. She matriculated at Wingen Heights Secondary school in Shallcross, Durban in 1995. Then in 1997, she joined the Market Theatre Laboratory for a two-year training stint.

She died on 11 January 2021, at the age of 44. According to her longtime agent, Lynne Higgins of Gaenor Artiste Management, Ndlovu died in her sleep on the morning due to COVID-19.

Career
Before entering cinema and television, she joined the Market Theatre and performed in many theatre plays.

Ndlovu started her acting career in 2011 when she played the role of "Qondi" in the Mzansi television serial Mazinyo Dot Q. In the same year, she made the film debut with biographical drama feature Winnie Mandela. After this success, she played the role of Malawian maid "Buseje" on SABC1 serial Ses'Top La. In 2013, she played the lead role in the film Little One directed by Darrell Roodt. She later won the SAFTA Golden Globe Award for the Best Actress in a feature film category at the 8th annual South African Film and Television Awards (SAFTA) for the role of "Pauline" in the film. After that critically acclaimed role, she acted in the film Safari again directed by Roodt.

Since then, she made several notable appearances in the serials such as; Stokvel, Soul City, Scandal!, Isidingo and Home Affairs. In 2013 she played the role of "Sponono" in the show, Zabalaza. Then in 2017, she played the role of "Sharon" on Mzansi Magic serial Lockdown. In September 2020, she joined the cast of Mzansi Magic isiZulu serial Ifalakhe. Before the death, she announced that she was going to join the cast of the DStv telenovela, Isono.

Filmography

References

External links

1977 births
2021 deaths
South African film actresses
South African television actresses
South African stage actresses
21st-century South African actresses
People from Soweto
Deaths from the COVID-19 pandemic in South Africa